Brigade 93 is one of many militias that formed in the wake of the Libyan Civil War. It is based in Bani Walid, a former stronghold of the Gaddafi regime. The militia is mainly composed of those still loyal to Gaddafi.

The brigade is named after the 1993 attempted coup against Gaddafi by members of the Warfalla tribe. Salem al-Ouaer, a member of the Warfalla tribe who sided with Gaddafi during the coup, is believed to head the militia.

In January 2012, the brigade was involved in the green-revolution in Bani Walid. On 25 of January, their unexpected uprising led to the retreat of the NTC forces from Bani Walid.

Weapons  and equipment
The brigade was said to possess heavy weapons, including 106 mm anti-tank guns. 

When they took over the May 28 Brigade base, they took heavy equipment, most notably tanks. In this video filmed after the takeover of the base by AFP, at least 4 tanks and a Grad rocket launcher are seen among the equipment captured by the Brigade 93.

References 

History of Libya under Muammar Gaddafi
Second Libyan Civil War
Aftermath of the First Libyan Civil War
Rebel groups in Libya